Chester Conn (né Master Chester Cohn; April 14, 1894 in San Francisco, California – April 4, 1973 in Flushing, Queens) was an American composer of popular music and music publisher.

Early life and career 
Chester was born to David Cohn and Minnie (née Newman; 1871–1946). At an early age, Chester was raised by his mother, who had become a widow sometime before 1900. In 1918, Cohn was working for Broadway Music Corp in New York.  In 1922, Cohn was working for Leo Feist, Inc., in its Chicago office.  In 1937, Conn co-founded the New York music publishing of Bregman, Vocco & Conn, Inc. ("BVC"). The other name partners were Jack Bregman (né Joseph Bregman; 1901–1967) and Rocco Vocco (1887–1960).  Chester Conn's only child, a son, Jack D. Conn (1926–1966), had been an executive at BVC. Given that Bregman, Vocco, and Jack Conn all predeceased Chester, Chester sold the firm in May 1967 to 20th Century Fox for 4.5 million dollars in cash.

Selected works 
Conn's best-known song is the jazz standard "Sunday" (Jule Styne, Ned Miller, Benny Krueger, lyrics; ©1926). The Jazz Discography Online, as of June 2017, lists 497 recording sessions for "Sunday" – from 1926 to 2015.  Other songs include "My Suppressed Desire" (Ned Miller, lyrics; ©1928), "Outside of Heaven" (Sammy Gallop, lyrics; ©1952), "Just Like Before" (co-composed with Bill Huston and Sammy Gallop; ©1953), "I Don't Think You Love Me Anymore" (Sammy Gallop, lyrics; ©1953), "Make Her Mine" (Sammy Gallop, lyrics; ©1954), "Forgive My Heart" (Sammy Gallop, lyrics; ©1955),
"Night Lights" (Sammy Gallop, co-composer; ©1956), "It's None of My Affair" (Sam Gallop, lyrics; ©1957), "Time To Go Home" (Sam Gallop, lyrics; ©1958), "Blue Waltz (La Valse Bleue)" (1960), "Anything I Do" (co-composed with George Douglas; ©1965), "Oh Well", and "Because You Lied."

Other works 

 "What'll You Do?"
 Chester Cohn (words)
 Ernie Erdman (music)
 Broadway Music Corp., New York
 © 22 November 1921; E523162

 "You Don't Like It, Not Much"
 Ned Miller
 Art Kahn
 Chester Cohn
 Leo Feist, Inc., New York
 © 25 June 1927; E665996
 (band arrangement by Onofrio Sciacca)

 "Why Should I Cry Over You"
 Chester Conn (w&m)
 Ned Miller (w&m)
 Leo Feist, Inc.
 © 14 April 1922; E534774
 © 19 May 1922; 538621
 © 7 July 1922; E542251
 (arrangement by Frank Edward Barry; 1883–1937 – staff arranger for Leo Feist)
 © 11 September 1922; E543788
 (arrangement by Frank Edward Barry)
 © 15 November 1922; E552081
 (arrangement for ukulele by William J. Smith)
 © 18 December 1922; E554461
 (arrangement for male voices by Alfred John Doyle, Sr.; 1874–1929)
 
 Sheet music, in pdf (public domain), courtesy University of Mississippi

 "Crying for You"
 Chester Cohn (music)
 Ned Miller (words)
 Leo Feist, Inc., New York
 © 22 November 1922; E549890
 © 9 July 1923; E563681 (Alt. link)
 © 24 November 1923; 555430
 

 "Don't Mind the Rain"
 Ned Miller (w&m)
 Chester Cohn (w&m)'
 Leo Feist, Inc., New York
 © 3 December 1923; E577690
 
 Sheet music, in pdf (public domain), courtesy York University

 "The Talk of the Town"
 Gus Kahn (words)
 Chester Conn (music)
 Leo Feist, Inc., New York
 © 17 December 1929; EU14672
 © 31 December 1929; EP12355
 

 "So Close to Me"
 Wayne King (w&m)
 Jerry Castillo (w&m)
 Chester Cohn (w&m)
 Leo Feist, Inc., New York
 © 15 September 1931; EP25135

 "Sicilian Tarantella" (American song title)
 "Fischiettando" (Italian song title)
 G. Balsamo (Italian composer)
 Ned Miller (words)
 Chester Conn (words)
 Triangle Music Corp., New York
 © 16 May 1949; EP36995
 

 "I'll Never Know Why"
 Sammy Gallop (words)
 Chester Conn (music)
 Bregman, Vocco & Conn, Inc.
 © 9 February 1951; EP52754
 

 "Will o' the Wisp Romance"
 Sammy Gallop (words)
 Chester Conn (music)
 Triangle Music Corp., New York
 © 25 February 1953; EP69771

 "That's You"
 Nelson Riddle (w&m)
 Sammy Gallop (w&m)
 Chester Conn (w&m)
 Bregman, Vocco & Conn, Inc.
 3 March 1960; EU616719

 "The Right Thing To Say"
 Sammy Gallop (words)
 Chester Conn (music)
 Bregman, Vocco & Conn, Inc.
 © 15 February 1962; EU706926

Performers of Conn's work 
The performers who have recorded Conn's songs include Nat King Cole, John Coltrane, Eddie Fisher, Coleman Hawkins, Milt Jackson, Carmen McRae, Gerry Mulligan, Buddy Rich, Frank Sinatra, Clark Terry, and Ben Webster, Lester Young.

Death 
Chester Conn died of a heart attack April 4, 1973, while living in Flushing, Queens, aged 78. He was stricken at the Aqueduct Racetrack. Conn was survived by his wife, Grace (née Grace Belle Goodman; 1885–1978), whom he married May 1, 1921, in Chicago. He was also survived as daughter-in-law, Ella Conn (née Raffaella Nardino; 1928–2010), and a grandson, Brian Conn (born 1961). Ella Conn (Chester's daughter-in-law) was an aunt to Gary Nardino (1935-1998), a notable Hollywood TV and film director, producer, and industry executive.

References

General references 
 "Sunday," by Sandra Burlingame (editor),

Notes

Original copyrights 
Catalog of Copyright Entries, Library of Congress, Copyright Office'''

Other inline citations

External links

1894 births
1973 deaths
American male composers
American composers
American lyricists
American music publishers (people)
20th-century American male musicians